Southern River is an electoral district of the Legislative Assembly in the state of Western Australia.

The district is a marginal seat based in the southern suburbs of Perth.

Geography
Southern River is an electorate situated in Perth's southern suburbs. The district includes the suburbs of Southern River and Huntingdale, as well as parts of the suburbs of Canning Vale and Gosnells.

History
Southern River was first contested at the 1996 state election. The seat was won by Liberal Party candidate Monica Holmes who defeated Labor candidate Judyth Watson, the latter being at the time member for the abolished Kenwick. Holmes was defeated at the 2001 state election by Labor candidate Paul Andrews.

The redistribution ahead of the 2005 state election shifted Southern River eastward, making the seat safer for the Labor Party. That election saw Paul Andrews defeat Monica Holmes a second time, with a much wider margin in large part due to the redistribution changes. The next redistribution saw much of the previous changes reversed, making Southern River once again a marginal seat. With Labor's hold on the seat now much more tenuous, Andrews was defeated at the 2008 state election by Liberal candidate Peter Abetz. Abetz held the seat through the 2013 state election but lost to Labor's Terry Healy at the 2017 state election.

Members for Southern River

Election results

References

External links
 ABC election profiles: 2005 2008
 WAEC district maps: current boundaries, previous distributions

Southern River